Sareh Bayat (born 6 October 1979) is an Iranian actress. She is best known for her role as Razieh in the Academy Award-winning A Separation (2011), for which she won the Silver Bear for Best Actress at the Berlin International Film Festival.

Filmography

Film

Web

Television

Awards
SilverBear for Best Actress in 61st Berlin Film Festival, Shared with other actresses of A Separation
Best actress in a supporting role in 29th Fajr International Film Festival for A Separation
Supporting Actress of the Year in 32nd London Critics Circle Film Awards for A Separation
Best Actress in Palm Springs International Film Festival, 2011 for A Separation - Shared with Leila Hatami and Sarina Farhadi

References

External links

1979 births
Living people
Actresses from Tehran
Iranian film actresses
Iranian stage actresses
Iranian television actresses
21st-century Iranian actresses
Silver Bear for Best Actress winners